Golay code may refer to:

 Binary Golay code, an error-correcting code used in digital communications
 Ternary Golay code
 (Golay) complementary sequences

fr:Code de Golay